Macimorelin (INN) – or Macrilen (trade name) – is a drug that was developed by Æterna Zentaris for use in the diagnosis of adult growth hormone deficiency. Macimorelin acetate, the salt formulation, is a synthetic growth hormone secretagogue receptor agonist. It is a growth hormone secretagogue receptor (ghrelin receptor) agonist causing release of growth hormone from the pituitary gland. Macimorelin acetate is described chemically as D-Tryptophanamide, 2-methylalanyl-N-[(1R)-1-(formylamino)-2-(1H-indol-3-yl)ethyl]-acetate.

Macimorelin (Macrilen™) was invented and first synthesized by the research group of Professor Martinez at University of Montpellier, Centre National de la Recherche Scientitifique (CNRS), France. This transpired from a long-lasting research collaboration with Aeterna Zentaris. Aeterna Zentaris later in-licensed macimorelin as a development candidate from the CNRS and proceeded with the pre-clinical and clinical development of the compound.

As of January 2014, it was in Phase III clinical trials. The phase III trial for growth hormone deficiency is expected to be complete in December 2016.

As of December 2017, it became FDA-approved as a method to diagnose growth hormone deficiency. Traditionally, growth hormone deficiency was diagnosed via means of insulin tolerance test (IST) or glucagon stimulation test (GST). These two means are done parenterally, whereas Macrilen boasts an oral formulation for ease of administration for patients and providers.

The U.S. Food and Drug Administration (FDA) considers it to be a first-in-class medication.

See also 
 List of growth hormone secretagogues

References

External links 
 
 

Formamides
Ghrelin receptor agonists
Growth hormone secretagogues
Tryptamines
Peptides